Since their first match in 2004, 64 women have represented the New Zealand national women's cricket team in Twenty20 Internationals (WT20Is). A Twenty20 International is a cricket match between two international representative teams, each having WT20I status, as determined by the International Cricket Council (ICC).

This list includes all players who have played at least one Twenty20 International match and is initially arranged in the order of debut appearance. Where more than one player won their first cap in the same match, those players are initially listed alphabetically by last name at the time of debut.

Key

Players 
Statistics are correct as of 19 February 2023.

Notes

References 

 
New Zealand